René Morales (born 22 February 1953) is a Guatemalan former footballer. He competed in the men's tournament at the 1976 Summer Olympics.

References

External links
 
 

1953 births
Living people
Guatemalan footballers
Guatemala international footballers
Olympic footballers of Guatemala
Footballers at the 1976 Summer Olympics
Xelajú MC players
Place of birth missing (living people)
Association football midfielders